Caroline Barker (1894–1988) was an Australian artist. She is best known for her portraits and still life. The Museum of Brisbane (formerly Brisbane's Civic Art Gallery) holds a large collection of her works.

Early life 
Caroline Barker was born on 8 September 1894 in Ascot Vale, Melbourne, Victoria, Australia.

She commenced her art studies at the art school at the Melbourne Art Gallery (now the National Gallery of Victoria) where she studied painting with Bernard Hall and drawing with Frederick McCubbin. There she was awarded second prize for her monochrome painting in 1917, which provided her with a year's free tuition, enabling her to complete her studies in 1919.

Due to her father's ill-health, the family relocated to Brisbane in Queensland in 1920. From 1921 to 1922, Barker became an art teacher at the Ipswich Girls Grammar School, saving her money in order to continue her studies in England.

She continued her studies at the Royal Academy of Arts in Piccadilly, London under Frederick Cayley Robinson and Charles Sims, where she also studied anatomy and the chemistry of painting, and then at the Byam Shaw School of Art under Vicat Cole. During this period her works were added to the collections of the Royal Academy, the Walker Art Gallery in Liverpool, the Paris Salon and the Byam Shaw.

Artist career 

Barker returned to Brisbane in November 1926. Initially she worked in the studios of Vida Lahey and Daphne Mayo before establishing her own studio in George Street.

In 1928, Barker painted a portrait of Lord Mayor of Brisbane William Jolly in his mayoral robes and exhibited it at the Royal Queensland Art Society. Charles Herbert Gough was so impressed by the work that he initiated a public subscription to purchase the portrait as a gift for the mayor from the citizens of Brisbane. As Jolly was a popular mayor, the public were generous in their donations and the portrait was presented to the mayor in December 1928.

Two of her works were used by The Queenslander newspaper for their colour covers, one of poinsettias in 1930 and another of gerbras and bougainvillea in 1931.

Barker taught art at a number of schools including Somerville House (1935-1946), Loreto College Coorparoo, Clayfield College, and St Margaret's Anglican Girls' School and at her own home. Her students include many notable artists including:
 Margaret Cilento
 Betty Churcher (née Cameron) 
 Dorothy Coleman
 Lola McCausland
 Margaret Olley
 John Rigby
 Hugh Sawrey
 Gordon Shepherdson

Later life 
Barker died on 23 July 1988 at South Brisbane.

Awards 
 Member of the Order of the British Empire for services to art, 30 December 1978

Gallery

References

External links 

20th-century Australian painters
1894 births
1988 deaths
19th-century Australian women artists
20th-century Australian women artists
Australian women painters
Artists from Melbourne
People from Ascot Vale, Victoria
National Gallery of Victoria Art School alumni
Artists from Brisbane